State Route 37 (SR 37) is a northwest-southeast highway (signed east–west) in Ohio.  It is the ninth longest state route in Ohio.  Its western terminus is at U.S. Route 224 and SR 12 in Findlay, and its eastern terminus is at SR 60 and SR 78 in McConnelsville.

History
State Route 37 is an original state highway that went from Lancaster to Marietta.  In 1932, the route was extended to Findlay along its current route.  In 1935, its eastern terminus was shortened to its current terminus, giving that route to State Route 78 and the now defunct State Route 77 (now part of State Route 60).

Major junctions

References

037
Transportation in Hancock County, Ohio
Transportation in Hardin County, Ohio
Transportation in Wyandot County, Ohio
Transportation in Marion County, Ohio
Transportation in Union County, Ohio
Transportation in Delaware County, Ohio
Transportation in Licking County, Ohio
Transportation in Fairfield County, Ohio
Transportation in Perry County, Ohio
Transportation in Morgan County, Ohio